Hudali  is a village in the southern state of Karnataka, India. It is located in the Belgaum taluk of Belgaum district in Karnataka.

Demographics
 India census, Hudali had a population of 15000 with 8230 males and 6770 females.

See also
 Districts of Karnataka

References

External links
 http://Belgaum.nic.in/

Villages in Belagavi district